Parres is one of the 28 parishes (administrative divisions) in Llanes, a municipality within the province and autonomous community of Asturias, in northern Spain.
Main villages or inhabited sites:

 Parres (village in Llanes, not the same name municipality)
 La Pereda
 Santa Marina
 Rumoru
 Bolao
 Los Carriles
 Las Melendreras
 Colmenera

The latest known population is 397, mainly located in Parres and La Pereda. Parres is the heading of this parish.

Parishes in Llanes